Fleurety is a Norwegian avant-garde metal band. The band was formed in 1991 by Svein Egil Hatlevik and Alexander Nordgaren.

History
The band released their first demo, Black Snow in 1993. After that came the 7-inch EP A Darker Shade of Evil in 1994, released via the British label Aesthetic Death Records. Both of these were in a fairly traditional Norwegian black metal style, although with very high-pitched screaming vocals, giving the band a characteristic sound.

Their album Min Tid Skal Komme, was released in 1995 in cooperation with Aesthetic Death Records and Misanthropy Records. This recording featured an avant-garde/psychedelic black metal style with atonal harmonics, folk music elements, and female vocals by Norwegian pop singer Marian Aas Hansen.

With 1999's mini-album Last-Minute Lies, the band moved even further away from their black metal origins. This recording and the following album was released by Supernal Music.

In 2000, Fleurety released their second album Department of Apocalyptic Affairs. This album showed an even more eclectic musical style, spanning metal, jazz and electronica, and featured an array of guest musicians from the intersection of the Norwegian black and avant garde metal scenes; among them Kristoffer Rygg and Tore Ylwizaker from Ulver, Hellhammer and Maniac from Mayhem, Carl-Michael Eide from Aura Noir and Ved Buens Ende, Steinar Sverd Johnsen from Arcturus, and Einar Sjursø from Beyond Dawn.

The Min Tid Skal Komme album was reissued by Candlelight Records in 2003, featuring the A Darker Shade of Evil recording and a track recorded for the 1995 Blackend compilation album, entitled "Absence". This album was also re-released in 2008 as a double gatefold LP through Aesthetic Death Records featuring the same material as the CD reissue plus the Black Snow demo.

In October 2009, Fleurety released the 7-inch vinyl ep Ingentes Atque Decorii Vexilliferi Apokalypsis. This release featured remakes of vintage material: the songs "Descent into Darkness", from the 1993 demo Black Snow and "Absence". "Descent into Darkness" includes Hellhammer and Necrobutcher of Mayhem, and Runhild Gammelsæter of Thorr's Hammer as guest musicians. This was the first in a string of EPs only available on vinyl and in a limited edition. The second release in the series, Evoco Bestias was released in December 2010.

In 2013, Fleurety released a new EP: Et Spiritus Meus Semper Sub Sanguinantibus Stellis Habitatabit. The fourth release in the series, Fragmenta Cuinsvis Aetatis Contemporaneae was released in 2017.

In the same year the band released a compilation Inquietum, which featuring all tracks from the 7-inch series.

In October 2017, Fleurety released their third album The White Death via Peaceville Records.

Discography

Studio albums
 Min Tid Skal Komme (1995)
 Department of Apocalyptic Affairs (2000)
 The White Death (2017)

EPs
 A Darker Shade of Evil (1994)
 Last-Minute Lies (1999)
 Ingentes Atque Decorii Vexilliferi Apokalypsis (2009)
 Evoco Bestias (2010)
 Et Spiritus Meus Semper Sub Sanguinantibus Stellis Habitabit (2013)
 Fragmenta Cuinsvis Aetatis Contemporaneae (2017)

Compilations
 Inquietum (2017)

Demos
 Black Snow (1993)

Members

Current members
Svein Egil Hatlevik – drums, synthesizer, vocals
Alexander Nordgaren – bass, guitar, vocals

References

External links
[ Fleurety] at Allmusic

Avant-garde Metal - Stories: Fleurety - Far Away From Any Messianic Complex 

Norwegian black metal musical groups
Norwegian avant-garde metal musical groups
Musical groups established in 1991
1991 establishments in Norway
Musical groups from Akershus